Alexandre Da Costa is a Canadian concert violinist and conductor from Montreal, Quebec.

He is the artistic director of the Orchestre Symphonique De Longueuil.

Education 
Da Costa has a bachelor's degree in performance (piano) from the Faculty of Music of the Université de Montréal and master's degree in violin.

He also studied violin at the Reina Sofía School of Music.

Career 
Da Costa is both a conductor and a virtuoso violinist who plays with a 1727 Stradivarius Di Barbaro violin using a Sartory bow.

In 2010, he won the Canada Council's Virginia Parker prize and has also won the Pablo Sarasate International Violin Competition. In 2012, he won the Juno Award for the Classical album of the Year.

In 2021, his contract as the artistic director of the Orchestre Symphonique De Longueuil was renewed for ten years.

See also 

 Canadian classical music
 List of Stradivarius instruments

References

External links
 Alexandre da Costa's Official Website
 Orchestre Symphonique De Longueuil Official Website (English landing page)

1979 births
Living people
Canadian classical violinists
Canadian male violinists and fiddlers
Musicians from Montreal
Juno Award for Classical Album of the Year – Large Ensemble or Soloist(s) with Large Ensemble Accompaniment winners
21st-century classical violinists
21st-century Canadian male musicians
21st-century Canadian violinists and fiddlers
Canadian artistic directors
21st-century Canadian conductors (music)